Taniela Otukolo (born 22 May 2002) is a Tongan professional rugby league footballer who plays as a  for the New Zealand Warriors in the NRL. He attended De La Salle College, Mangere East for all his college years.

Background
"Nella" Otukolo was born in Tofoa, Tongatapu, Tonga.

He played his junior rugby league for the Otahuhu Leopards.

Playing career
In round 15 of the 2021 NRL season, Otukolo made his first grade debut for the Warriors against the Newcastle Knights.

References

External links
New Zealand Warriors profile

2002 births
Living people
New Zealand Warriors players
Rugby league hookers
Tongan rugby league players